</noinclude>Meadows is a medieval English surname. Commonly recorded alternative spellings are Medows, Meddowes and Medewes.

The name is topographical in origin, indicating someone who lived near a meadow or grassland, and derives from the pre-7th century word for meadow "maed", or Middle English "mede". 

Notable people with the surname include:

Abram Henson Meadows (1859–1932), American showman
Audrey Meadows (1922–1996), American actress
Austin Meadows (born 1995), American baseball player
Bernard Meadows (1915–2005), British sculptor
Bobby Meadows (born 1938), English footballer
Brian Meadows (born 1975), American baseball player
Catherine Meadows, American cryptographer
Charles Medows (1737–1816), British nobleman & naval officer
Clarence W. Meadows (1904–1961), American Attorney General
Daniel Meadows (born 1952), British photographer
Dennis Meadows (born 1942), American scientist
Dennis Meadows (politician) (born 1966), Jamaican Senator
Donella Meadows (1941–2001), American environmental scientist
Earle Meadows (1913–1992), American pole-vaulter
Frederick Meadows (active 1908), Canadian athlete
Gavin Meadows (born 1977), British swimmer
Ian Meadows (born 1983), Australian actor & writer
Isabel Meadows (1846–1939), American native linguist
Jason Meadows (born 1971), American musician
Jayne Meadows (1919–2015), American actress
James Meadows (disambiguation page), several individuals
James Joseph Meadows (1835–1914), English missionary
John Meadows (disambiguation page), several individuals
Johnny Meadows (Australian footballer) (1880–1974), Australian footballer
Joyce Meadows (born 1933), Canadian actress
Kenny Meadows (1790–1874), British illustrator & caricaturist
Kristen Meadows (born 1957), American TV actress
Louie Meadows (born 1961), American baseball player
Mark Meadows (disambiguation page), several individuals
Marion Meadows, American jazz musician
Matthew Meadows (born 1938), American politician
Michael Meadows (born 1987), English racing driver
Miles Meadows, Canadian actor & singer
Peter S. Meadows, British political scientist
Punky Meadows (born 1950), American guitarist
Richard J. Meadows (1931–1995), American soldier
Rob Meadows (born 1976), American internet entrepreneur
Roy Meadow (born 1933), British paediatrician
Shane Meadows (born 1972), British film director
Sidney Meadows (c.1699–1792), British Member of Parliament
Stanley Meadows (born 1931), British actor
Stephen Meadows (born 1950), American actor & architect
Susannah Meadows, American journalist
Tim Meadows (born 1961), American actor & comedian
Travis Meadows, American country musician
William Meadows (1833–1920), Anglo-American agriculturist & politician
Michael Meadows (1955-), a British-South African Emeritus Professor of physical geography

Further reading
http://www.ancestry.co.uk/name-origin?surname=meadows
http://www.surnamedb.com/Surname/Meadows#ixzz4AVYVkg1N

Surnames
Surnames of English origin
Surnames of British Isles origin
English-language surnames